The 2000–01 Druga HNL was the 10th season of Druga HNL, the second level league in Croatian football. The format of the league was unchanged from the 1999–2000 season. A total of 18 clubs competed in Druga HNL this season, in a double round-robin format.

Due to the expansion of top level Prva HNL set for the 2001–02 season, four clubs were promoted at the end of season (Kamen Ingrad, Pomorac Kostrena, Zadar and TŠK Topolovac, while Solin entered promotion playoff). Also, Druga HNL was split into two divisions the following season.

Clubs

League table

See also
2000–01 Prva HNL
2000–01 Croatian Cup

External links
2000–01 in Croatian Football at Rec.Sport.Soccer Statistics Foundation
Official website  

First Football League (Croatia) seasons
Druga HNL
Cro